The Pontifical Catholic University of Rio de Janeiro (PUC-Rio) is a Jesuit, Catholic, pontifical university in Rio de Janeiro, Brazil. It is the joint responsibility of the Catholic Archdiocese of São Sebastião do Rio de Janeiro and the Society of Jesus. In 2019, PUC-Rio was ranked as the fourth best university in Latin America by Times Higher Education magazine.

History
The University was created in 1941 by the Society of Jesus to emphasize humanistic values in the pursuit of knowledge. PUC-Rio has 12,000 undergraduate students, 2,500 graduate students, and 4,000 extension students. In 2009 it ranked first among 2,252 higher education institutions in Brazil on ENADE, a benchmark exercise run by the Brazilian Ministry of Education.

PUC-Rio has highly accredited faculties in law, engineering, computer science, psychology, economics, business, and international relations. It fosters cultural diversity in its student body. It has participated in exchange programs with Harvard, Notre Dame, UC Berkeley, UCLA, Brown University as well as European universities, with hundreds of students participating each year.

Location
PUC-Rio is located in Gávea in the south of Rio, at the edge of Tijuca National Forest. The campus was once a coffee farm. A creek crossed by three bridges runs through the campus. Several city bus lines pass the university, which is near the suburban neighborhoods of Leblon, Ipanema, Jardim Botânico, and Lagoa. Metrô busses connect the campus to the Antero de Quental subway station in Leblon and the Botafogo subway station on Botafogo beach. The Botanical Gardens and Leblon beach are within walking distance to the university.

Campus

The campus was built with donations from institutions and foundations in the early 1940s. In the early '60s the USA through its American Schools and Hospitals Abroad program donated the building now named after President John Kennedy; the grant was received during his administration. Besides the Central Library there are three specialized libraries. Solar Grandjean de Montigny (built in 1823 by the architect of the same name), PUC-Rio's Cultural Center, has year-round visual arts exhibitions. Pilotis (Kennedy building's ground floor) hosts cultural events such as political debates, shows, and fairs. The "Festa Junina" each June features folkloric food, costumes, and dance from old Brazil.

On campus are three restaurants, five coffee-shops, a pizza-parlor, a bookstore, an office supply store, copy centers, branches of Banco Itaú and Banco Santander Brasil, a post office, newsstand, and ATMs. The neighborhood of the university contains more shops, banks, the Planetarium, specialized bookstores, restaurants, and a mall.

PUC-Rio can be divided into four university centers, each center is made of dozens of units and supplementary organs responsible for education, research and extension in their respective areas of knowledge.

 Center for Social Sciences: is one of the four deanships of the Pontifical Catholic University of Rio de Janeiro. It consists of nine departments administration, social science, social communication, law, economy, geography and environment, history, social service and international relations.
 Science and Technology Center:  is one of the four deanships of the Pontifical Catholic University of Rio de Janeiro. It has ten courses in engineering (petroleum, control and automation, production, computing, chemical engineering, materials and nanotechnology, electrical, mechanical and environmental), two computer science (information systems and computer science) the bachelor's degrees in mathematics, physics and chemistry.
 Center of Theology and Human Sciences: is one of the four deanships of the Pontifical Catholic University of Rio de Janeiro. It consists of seven departments, eight undergraduate courses, eight graduate programs, In addition to the departments of architecture and urbanism, arts and design, education, philosophy, letters, psychology and theology, the Institute of Advanced Studies in Humanities (IEAHu) and the Carlo Maria Martini Chair are part of the deanery.

Admission
For undergraduate admission to PUC-Rio two exams are used: ENEM and its own vestibular test. The results of these tests are used in determining the distribution of academic scholarships to students. PUC-RIO accepted 12% of applicants for the class of 2022 making it a very selective institution.

Research

The Lua programming language was developed by Roberto Ierusalimschy, Luiz Henrique de Figueiredo, and Waldemar Celes, members of the Computer Graphics Technology Group at PUC-Rio, beginning in 1993.

Notable alumni

Alex Behring, co-founder 3G Capital
Arminio Fraga
Arnaldo Jabor
Adriana Ferreyr
Beny Parnes
Bernardo Rezende
Bianca Comparato
Carlos Alberto Menezes Direito
Carlos Diegues
Cecília Malan
Cristiane Murray
Eduardo Paes
Fernanda Abreu
Gregorio Duvivier
Gustavo Franco
Jaques Wagner
João Clemente Baena Soares
João Moreira Salles
Marcelo Adnet
Marcelo Camelo
Marcelo Gleiser
Marielle Franco
Nara Leão
Patrícia Carlos de Andrade
Pedro Bial
Pedro Malan
Renata Vasconcellos
Roberto Ierusalimschy, co-creator Lua (programming language)
Rodrigo Amarante
Rodrigo Constantino
Rodrigo Santoro
Walter Salles
Rodrigo R. Soares, Columbia University economist

Faculty 
The following are a partial list of professors from the Pontifical Catholic University of Rio de Janeiro.

Affonso Romano de Sant'Anna
Alceu Amoroso Lima
Alessandro Molon
Ana Maria Machado
Carlos Alberto Menezes Direito
Everardo Rocha
Flávio Carneiro
Gustavo Franco
Ivo Pitanguy
João Moreira Salles
Marcílio Marques Moreira
Nancy D. Erbe (in 2015)
Pedro Bloch
Pedro Malan
Roberto DaMatta
Roberto Ierusalimschy

See also
 Brazil University Rankings
 List of Jesuit sites
 Universities and Higher Education in Brazil

References

External links
PUC-Rio
Avaliacoes

 
Educational institutions established in 1940
Schools of international relations
1940 establishments in Brazil
Pontifical universities in Brazil